Empire of Silver is a 2009 historical epic film written and directed by Christina Yao, based on the novel The Silver Valley by Cheng Yi. It focuses on a wealthy banking clan in Pingyao, Shanxi and its fortunes during the turn-of-the-century Chinese economic and political turmoil. The film stars Aaron Kwok and Jennifer Tilly.

Cast
Aaron Kwok as Third Master
 Zhang Tielin as Lord Kang
 Hao Lei as Madame Kang
 Jennifer Tilly as Mrs. Landdeck
 Jonathan Kos-Read as Pastor Landdeck
 Lei Zhenyu as Manager Dai
 Ding Zhicheng as Qiu Taiji
 John Paisley as Dr. Wilson
 Chin Shih-chieh as Manager Liu
 Tien Niu as Yu Feng
 Hou Tongjiang as Chief Manager Sun
 Shi Xiaoman as Lao Xia
 Shi Dasheng as First Master
 Hei Zi as Second Master
 Wang Deshun as Chang You
 Chang Lan-tian as Eunuch
 Lü Zhong as Lu Sao
 Li Yixiao as Fourth wife
 Du Jiang as Fourth Master
 Guo Tao as Bandit chief
 Xu Zhengyun as Manager Zhou
 Wu Fang as San Xi
 Wang Shuang as Third Wife
 Mou Ruiying as Second wife
 Chi Guodong as Qing official
 Dennis Chan as Governor 
 Chen Jun as Escort A
 Xia Le as Escort B
 Liu Zhongyuan as Fifth Master (narrator)
 Chai Jin 
 Sing Ning

References

External links
official website http://www.empireofsilver.com

2009 films
2000s historical films
Taiwanese historical films
Hong Kong historical films
Hong Kong epic films
Chinese historical films
Chinese epic films
Films set in the Qing dynasty
2000s Mandarin-language films
Films based on Chinese novels
2009 directorial debut films
2000s Hong Kong films